The Restonica is a small river in the department of Haute-Corse, Corsica, France.
It is a tributary of the river Tavignano.
The river has a steep and rocky course with many pools and waterfalls. 
The valley contains two lakes, and is a popular tourist destination.

Course

It rises to the north of the  Punta Muzzella in the canton of Corte.
It originates in the Lac de Melu.
The river continues in a northeast direction to join the Tavignano in the town of Corte.
The Lac de l'Oriente to the north of the  Monte Rotondo, drains through the Ruisseau de Lamento or Timozzo, a tributary of the Restonica.
The small Lac de Pozzolo to the east of Monte Rotondo drains through the Ruisseau de Pozzolo, a tributary of the Ruisseau de Rivesecco, another tributary of the Restonica.
The D623 road follows the river for most of its course.

Tourism

It is accessible by the narrow and winding D623, which extends up to the Bergeries de Grutelle.
In 2009 the municipality of Corte developed a plan to reconcile its protection, development and tourist exploitation.
The Restonica Valley  is an important source of tourist income for central Corsica and has been a listed site since 1966.
Tourists may visit to contemplate the scenery, to swim in its clear waters, or to access the high mountains via the GR20 trails.

It can be very busy in the high season.

The banks of the river are lined with pines.
The course of the river is dotted with waterfalls and deep natural basins carved into the granite that visitors can use to cool off during the heat of summer.
A marked trail leads from the Bergeries de Grotelle at the end of the D623 to Lac de Melo, a hike of about an hour.
It is frozen for half the year.
Lake Capitello is higher up and can be reached with another one-hour walk up a much harder trail.

Tributaries
The following streams (ruisseaux) are tributaries of the Restonica (ordered by length) and sub-tributaries:

 Rivisecco 
 Pianella 
 Bravino 
 Formicuccia 
 Coloneili 
 Timozzo 
 Figarella 
 Nucario 
 Castelli 
 Prate di Giodda 
 Pozzi 
 Sorbello 
 Rinoso 
 Frasseta 
 Valdaniello 
 Cavacciole 
 Renelluccio 
 Grottelle 
 Camorrette

Gallery

Notes

Sources

 

Rivers of Haute-Corse
Rivers of France